The Lotte World Tower is a  123-story supertall skyscraper located in Sincheon-dong, Songpa, Seoul, South Korea. It opened to the public on April 3, 2017, and is currently the tallest building in South Korea and the sixth tallest in the world.

History 
After 13 years of planning and site preparation, the tower gained final approval to start construction by the government in November 2010 and the first groundbreaking activities of piling and frame assembly were observed at the construction site in March.

On New Year Eve of 2016, the LED-pixels of the facade displayed the number "2016".

On April 3, 2017, Lotte shot off fireworks to celebrate the tower's official opening.

On January 1, 2018, Lotte shot off fireworks with a LED laser show for seven minutes to celebrate New Year's Day and the 2018 PyeongChang Winter Olympics.

Design

Height
On March 17, 2016, before the final phase of external construction, the Diagrid lantern-shaped roof structure was completed. The roof structure was constructed with steel counterparts that are each  and weigh 20 tons. Approximately 3,000 tons of steel parts, a high-precision 64t tower crane and GPS alignment systems, as well as highly skilled welding technicians, were used in the construction of the roof. It is also the fifth largest building in the world as of 2016, and as of 2023 it is the sixth tallest building in the world.

Landmark
Lotte World Tower is a landmark of Seoul and the first 100-story building in Korea. When it was completed, it was the fourth-highest tower in the world and the highest in the OECD countries. The conceptual design calls for a slender cone with convex, gently curved sides. An exterior of pale-coloured glass draws inspiration from Korean ceramics and features accents of metal filigree.

Floor plans

Main facilities

Seoul Sky is located on the 117th – 123rd floors. The 117th floor is the entrance floor and the view floor; the 118th floor has the Sky Friendly Cafe and Sky Terrace. The Photozone is located on the 119th floor, Seoul Sky Cafe on the 122nd floor, and the 123 lounge, a premium lounge bar, on the 123rd floor. There are four media stands on the 117th and 118th floors. The view floor has prominent views of the city, as well as a glass floor and a telescope. (Admission to the observatory is KRW 29,000 for adults over the age of 13 based on general tickets and KRW 25,000 for children over 36 months to under 12) The skylight of Seoul Sky was the highest glass floor observatory as of the tower's completion. Lotte Tower and One World Trade Center have concluded an operation and technical service agreement.

Incidents and accidents

Safety issues
In 2013 and 2014, three construction workers died during the construction of the tower, and an executive director of Lotte's construction arm was given a suspended sentence of eight months in prison in 2016 for his role in neglecting safety measures at the site. In December 2014, the Seoul city government ordered the mall and cinema complex at the base of the tower, which opened before completion of the tower, to be closed for five months after water was found leaking from an internal aquarium. Independent engineers who assessed the building found that these issues bore little relation to the overall structural integrity of the building and the mall and cinema complex reopened in 2015.

Urban exploration
In 2016, two Russian and Ukrainian urban explorers, Vadim Makhorov and Vitaly Raskalov from Ontheroofs, illegally climbed the under-construction Lotte World Tower through stairs and Vitaly Raskalov then free-climbed up the crane on the tower's top.
The video was viewed over 4 million times as of March 2023 and received worldwide media attention. 
Following the climb, Lotte World Tower released posters with the photos of Vitaly Raskalov and Vadim Makhorov and banned them from the building.

Gallery

See also
 Busan Lotte Town Tower
 List of buildings with 100 floors or more
 List of tallest buildings in Seoul
 List of tallest buildings in South Korea
 Lotte World
 Lotte World Mall

References

External links 

 Lotte World Tower Official Website

Office buildings completed in 2016
Lotte Corporation
Kohn Pedersen Fox buildings
Buildings and structures in Songpa District
Skyscraper office buildings in Seoul
Residential skyscrapers in South Korea
Skyscraper hotels in South Korea
Tourist attractions in Seoul
2016 establishments in South Korea